In tennis, the 2015 US Open Series (known as Emirates Airline US Open Series for sponsorship reasons) is the twelfth edition of the US Open Series, which includes a group of hard court tournaments that starts on July 27, 2015 in Atlanta and concluded in Winston-Salem for the men and in New Haven for the women on August 30, 2015. This edition consists of three separate men's tournaments and three women's tournaments, with the Western & Southern Open hosting both a men's and women's event. The series is headlined by two ATP World Tour Masters 1000 and two WTA Premier 5 events.

Point distribution for series events
In order to be included in the final standings and subsequently the bonus prize money, a player needs to have countable results from at least two different tournaments. Starting from the 2014 season, a new rule has been added to double the points of a player who has obtained countable results in at least three tournaments.

The players who finish in the top three in the series can earn up to $1 million in extra prize money at the US Open.

US Open Series standings
The standings include all players who received points in at least two tournaments.

ATP

Notes:
 1 – Tours – Number of tournaments in US Open Series in which a player has reached the quarterfinals or better, in 250 series events, or the Round of 16 in ATP World Tour Masters 1000 events.
 2 –  Indicates a player has earned points in at least three Emirates Airline US Open Series events, therefore doubling his point total earned on the Series.

WTA

Notes:
 1 – Tours – Number of tournaments in US Open Series in which a player has reached the quarterfinals or better, in Premier events; or the Round of 16 or better in Premier 5 events.
 2 –  Indicates a player has earned points in at least three Emirates Airline US Open Series events, therefore doubling her point total earned on the Series.

Bonus prize money
Top three players in the 2015 US Open Series will receive bonus prize money, depending on where they finish in the 2015 US Open, according to money schedule below.

Tournament Schedule

Week 1

ATP – BB&T Atlanta Open

American John Isner and doubles partners Vasek Pospisil and Jack Sock headlined the event as the top three seeds. Isner, a two-time defending champion, advanced to the third straight final, losing only one set against fellow American and a qualifier at the tournament Denis Kudla in semifinals. Marcos Baghdatis, a fifth seed, advanced to his first final since 2011, defeating second seed Pospisil before edging Gilles Müller in three sets to reach final. In the final, Isner claimed his 10th career title after defeating Baghdatis 6–3, 6–3.

Main draw finals

Week 2

WTA – Bank of the West Classic

Caroline Wozniacki, Agnieszka Radwańska and Angelique Kerber headlined the event. In the first half of the draw, three seeds of four were upset in the second round, including first seed Wozniacki, who lost to Varvara Lepchenko. As a result, fourth seed Karolína Plíšková reached final without dropping set, beating Lepchenko in a semifinal. In the other side of the draw, Angelique Kerber defeated Radwańska in three sets, before easy semifinal win over eight seed Elina Svitolina. Kerber beat Plíšková 6–3, 5–7, 6–4 to win her fourth title of the year, tying Serena Williams at the moment.

Main draw finals

Week 3

ATP – Rogers Cup (Montreal)

Eight of the world top 10 players headlined the event, with Novak Djokovic, Andy Murray and Stan Wawrinka led the field. Qualifier Ernests Gulbis had two match points against first seed Djokovic in quarterfinals, but eventually lost. Djokovic went on to reach the final, after win over another unseeded player, Jérémy Chardy. Murray beat defending champion Jo-Wilfried Tsonga in quarterfinals, before losing just three games against Kei Nishikori in semifinals. Murray defeated Djokovic in the final 6–4, 4–6, 6–3, meaning that Djokovic lost for the first time since 2012 when playing in Masters 1000 final, a streak that included 12 titles.

Main draw finals

WTA – Rogers Cup (Toronto)

Nine of the world top 10 players headlined the event, with Serena Williams, wildcard Simona Halep and Petra Kvitová being the top 3 seeds. Though Williams came fresh-off two grand slam titles, it was all about young Swiss Belinda Bencic in that half of draw, who defeated five Grand Slam finalists in a row to reach the final, including also three wins over top 10 players at the moment, against Caroline Wozniacki, Ana Ivanovic in quarterfinals, and Williams in semifinals. In the bottom half of the draw, Halep faced also three grand slam finalists, and after defeating Sara Errani she reached the final. In the final, Bencic became the youngest player to win the tournament, overtaking feat from Ivanovic, when was up 7–6(7–5), 6–7(4–7), 3–0 before another grand slam finalist Halep retired.

Main draw finals

Week 4

ATP – Western & Southern Open (Cincinnati)

Nine of the world top 10 players entered the tournament, with the pack headlined by top three players: Novak Djokovic, recent Montreal champion Andy Murray and Roger Federer, who missed Montreal. First seed Djokovic lost set against David Goffin and qualifier Alexandr Dolgopolov in semifinals. In both occasions he came back from brink of the loss, when trailing 0–3 in third set in former, and being two points away from losing in latter. Playing in his first tournament since the Wimbledon final, Federer reached the final of the tournament after defeating Murray in the semifinals. Federer ended up winning seventh Cincinnati title after defeating Djokovic 7–6(7–1), 6–3, which ensured his position as the No. 2 seed in the upcoming US Open.

Main draw finals

WTA – Western & Southern Open (Cincinnati)

All of the top 10 players entered the tournament, but later no. 2 Maria Sharapova withdrew, as she did also in Toronto. Other top four seeds then headlined the tournament, with the pack led by Serena Williams, Simona Halep and Petra Kvitová. Williams worked hard to beat sixth seed Ana Ivanovic in quarterfinals, who led by a set and break, but except that win all were much easier, including semifinal win over Elina Svitolina. In bottom half of the draw, Halep lost two sets in both matches before quarterfinals, but then had two straight sets victories, with semifinal win over Jelena Janković securing place in the final and also her position as the no. 2 seed in the upcoming US Open. Williams went on to defend title by beating Halep 6–3, 7–6(7–5), in the final.

Main draw finals

Week 5

ATP – Winston-Salem Open

Main draw finals

WTA – Connecticut Open

Main draw finals

References

External links